Raktham is a 1981 Indian Malayalam film, written by Kaloor Dennis, directed by Joshiy and produced by Jagan Appachan under Jagan Pictures. The film stars Prem Nazir, Madhu, Srividya and MG Soman in the lead roles. The film has musical score by Johnson and cinematography was handled by N. A. Thara. The film revolves around CI Haridas (Nazir) and his family, consisting of his wife Malathy (Srividya) and daughter (Sonia) and Viswanathan (Madhu) a military man and his revenge against the people who killed his wife and threatened his family.This is the first movie of Captain Raju as an actor 

The film was declared a hit and was remade in Tamil as Saatchi, in Telugu as Balidaanam and in Hindi as Balidaan.

Plot

CI Haridas (Prem Nazir) lives a wealthy lifestyle in Bombay along with his aunt while his father, retired Major Nair lives in the countryside in a farmhouse. Haridas meets and falls in love with Malathy (Srividya), who lives opposite his house along with her father, Pillechan ashan (Sankaradi) and her mother Janki (Shubha Khote). When Pillechan ashan finds out that Malathy and Haridas are in love, he forbids her to see him, but subsequently relents when she takes poison. Both Haridas and Malathy get married and shortly thereafter give birth to a girl. After some time Haridas has been specially appointed by the government to catch dangerous, deadly criminal Padmanabhan (Balan K Nair) who is the leader of a bandit's gang, once they stop a wedding party bus on the Bombay-Poona Highway, loot, sexually molest females, and kill several passengers, Haridas is successful in arresting one of the gangsters, a Hotel Manager named Gunda (Captain Raju), who colluded with the bandits, but Advocate Ghaswala (Asrani) defends him and gets him acquitted, resulting in the killing of the only eye-witness, a 10-year-old boy. In retaliation, Haridas beats up and kills Gunda, which results in his suspension. Then Haridas starts getting threats and has a bomb planted in his house. The panic-stricken family flees to Major Nair's farmhouse, but bandits locate them there and forcibly abduct Malathy and their daughter after assaulting Major Nair. Haridas must now rush to save his wife and daughter, but he could save only his daughter; Malathy dies by falling under the train. Now Vijay decides to take revenge against Padmanabhan (Balan K Nair) and his gang, he eliminates them one by one and finally, surrenders him to the judiciary.

Cast
Madhu as Vishwanathan
Prem Nazir as CI Haridas 
Srividya as Malathy
M. G. Soman as Dr Venu
Jose Prakash as Major Nair
Sankaradi as Pillechan ashan
Captain Raju as Gunda
Balan K. Nair as Padmanabhan
Mala Aravindan as Kuttappan
Sumalatha as Valsala
Roja Ramani as Sreekutti
Cochin Haneefa as Neelakandan
Azeez as SP
Ravi Menon as Johny
Jagannatha Varma as George
Sonia as Haridas's daughter 
Sathyachithra as Padmanabhan's lover
EO Joseph as Ramankutty

Soundtrack
The music was composed by Johnson and the lyrics were written by R. K. Damodaran.

References

External links
 

1981 films
1980s Malayalam-language films
Indian action films
Malayalam films remade in other languages
Films shot in Mumbai
1981 action films